Pavlo Feofanovich Shandruk (February 28, 1889 in Volhynia – February 15, 1979 in Trenton, New Jersey) was a general in the army of the Ukrainian National Republic, a colonel of the Polish Army, and a prominent general of the Ukrainian National Army, a military force that fought against the Soviet Union under Nazi German command at the close of World War II.

Shandruk was born in the village of Borsuky, near Kremenets in the Volhynia Governorate of the Russian Empire (present-day Ternopil Oblast of Ukraine). He completed his studies in 1911 at the Nizhyn Institute majoring in history and languages and later underwent post graduate studies at the Alexandrovsk Military Academy in Moscow.

Military career 
In the First World War Shandruk was the commander of the IIIrd Battalion of the 232nd Reserve Infantry Regiment of the Russian Imperial Army. With the outbreak of the Russian Revolution he joined the Ukrainian National Republic in its struggle against both White and Red Russian forces. He was successively in command of the Zaporozhian Independent Rifle Battalion, the 9th Infantry Regiment and the 1st Recruit Regiment of the Ukrainian National Republic forces. After the reorganization of the army in 1920, he led the 4th Brigade of the 3rd Infantry Division. After the failed Kiev Offensive and the subsequent collapse of the Ukrainian National republic, he was interned in Kalisz, Poland together with the remaining Ukrainian soldiers. He testified for Symon Petliura at Schwartzbard trial along with Mykola Shapoval, and Oleksandr Shulhin.

Until 1936, he worked in different positions for the Ukrainian National Republic government in exile initially led by Symon Petliura. In 1936 he joined the Polish Army, after which he obtained further training in the Wyższa Szkoła Wojenna (Military Academy). Upon the completion of his training he accepted a commission and was promoted to the rank of major in the Polish Army.

As a colonel he fought in the Polish Army in September 1939.  On September 23 Colonel Shandruk rescued the 19th Polish brigade from annihilation in a trap. After the war he received the Virtuti Militari cross from Władysław Anders for this action. After capitulation, Shandruk, as a Polish officer, was captured and sent to a German POW Camp, from where he was later released due to his injuries.  After falling ill, he was arrested by the Gestapo but set free before the Germans attacked the Soviet Union.

From 1940 till 1944 he worked as a cinema manager in Skierniewice. During this time he was employing and giving shelter to Polish underground members, hunted by the Gestapo.

The Ukrainian National Army

In February 1945 he accepted the position of the head of the Ukrainian National Committee and simultaneously became the commander of the newly formed Ukrainian National Army into which all Ukrainian formations who had fought on the German side on the Eastern front were merged. (It came to about 50,000 men).

In April 1945 now General Shandruk joined the soldiers of the Ukrainian National Army located at the front in Austria. On 28 April the UNA swore an oath of allegiance to Ukraine.

Surrender 
On May 8, 1945, Shandruk and the 14th Waffen Grenadier Division of the SS (1st Ukrainian), the main part of the Ukrainian National Army, surrendered to American and British forces in Austria. After that, he requested a meeting with the Polish general Władysław Anders in London, and asked him to protect the army from deportation to Soviet Union. After the personal intervention of General Anders, Shandruk and his soldiers were considered by the Western Allies as Polish pre-war citizens (without checking whether they had Polish citizenship or not) and so, unlike most Ukrainian soldiers, they were not sent to the USSR. This provoked fierce protests from the Soviets.

Post World War II
Later, he lived in Germany and the United States. Shandruk penned a number of works regarding military history in Ukrainian, Polish and English, among them 
 «Arms of Valor» (Нью-Йорк 1959) «Arms of Valor» NY, 1959. He was the editor of the collection of documents regarding the Ukrainian-Russian war of 1920.

Shandruk was decorated with Polish Virtuti Militari order for his performance in Polish Army during the 1939 defensive war.

He became a full member of the Shevchenko Scientific Society in 1948.

Further reading
 Боляновський А. Шандрук Павло // Довідник з історії України. — 2-е видання. — К., 2001. — С. 1068.
 Паньківський К. Роки німецької окупації. Нью-Йорк — Торонто 1965.
 P.Abbott, E.Pinak. Ukrainian Armies 1914-55, Men At Arms n°412, Osprey publishing, 2004 Leeds UK.  (с 41)

References

External links
  «Arms of Valor» (Нью-Йорк 1959)
 Біляїв Володимир. На неокраянім крилі… — Донецьк: Східний видавничий дім, 2003.

1889 births
1979 deaths
People from Ternopil Oblast
People from Volhynian Governorate
Russian military personnel of World War I
Polish military personnel of World War II
Ukrainian collaborators with Nazi Germany
Ukrainian generals
Ukrainian people of World War I
Ukrainian refugees
Nizhyn Gogol State University alumni
Recipients of the Virtuti Militari
Polish emigrants to the United States